A dievdirbys ("god maker", plural: dievdirbiai) is a Lithuanian  wood carver who creates statues of Jesus and the Christian saints in more recent times, but used to create statues of the Lithuanian pagan deities. The art is closely related to Lithuanian cross crafting, listed among Masterpieces of the Oral and Intangible Heritage of Humanity by UNESCO.

The statues are carved according to artistic conventions developed over the centuries following Lithuania's adoption of Christianity. They are displayed along roadsides, in cemeteries, and in chapels or churches.

Popular figures are of Saint Roch, the Pietà, John of Nepomuk, Saint Casimir, the Nativity, Pensive Christ (known as rūpintojėlis), Saint Florian, Saint George, Saint Anthony, Saint Agatha, and Saint Isidore the Laborer.

Using basic tools, the sculptures were carved out of linden wood, or occasionally oak, and sometimes painted. Along with three-dimensional sculptures, relief and bas-relief were also cultivated. The works decorate the altars of rural churches, of portable church altars, processional banners, aediculas, dwellings, and barns. The Stations of the Cross often feature these works as well.

Gallery

References

External links
  Dievdirbiai exhibition at the Lithuanian Art Museum in Vilnius  
 Gallery of dievdirbiai carvings

Lithuanian folk art
Folk art
Christianity in Lithuania
Carving
Woodcarving